Hurricane Doreen was considered the worst tropical cyclone to affect California in 32 years. The tenth tropical cyclone, fourth named storm, and second hurricane of the otherwise inactive 1977 Pacific hurricane season, it developed on August 13. The depression tracked northwestward, intensifying into Tropical Storm Doreen later that day. Further strengthening occurred over the subsequent days, and Doreen attained its peak as a minimal hurricane early on August 15. Executing a turn towards the north-northwest, Doreen made its first landfall as a Category 1 hurricane on the Saffir–Simpson Hurricane Wind Scale near Puerto San Carlos. Drifting offshore, Doreen made a second and final landfall near the northern portion of the Baja California as a tropical storm before rapidly weakening to a tropical depression. The tropical depression dissipated south of southern California on August 18.

Hurricane Doreen and its remnants caused severe flooding in northwestern Mexico and the southwestern United States. In Mexico, heavy rainfall was reported on both Baja California and the mainland of Mexico. Flooding left 2,000 people homeless in Mexicali along the United States-Mexico border, in addition, 325 homes and businesses were destroyed in southern California. Several highways were also flooded during the passage of the storm, most notably, lanes on Interstate 8 and Interstate 15 were washed out. In San Diego and Imperial County, the total damage to agricultural interests was $25 million (1977 USD). In addition, eight fatalities were reported in California. Elsewhere, impact from Doreen was relatively light.

Meteorological history

Another flight into the storm shortly thereafter confirmed that Doreen had intensified into a hurricane at 1800 UTC.

Doreen approached the Baja California Peninsula, as it maintained minimal hurricane status. By August 18 at 1800 UTC, Doreen was centered only  when it curved northwestward. Late on August 18, the storm made landfall on the western coast of Baja California as a minimal hurricane. As a result, Doreen weakened to a tropical storm before making another landfall on the Port Eugenia Peninsula on August 16 shortly after 0600 UTC. Once again, Doreen quickly re-emerged into the Pacific Ocean over the Bay of Sebastián Vizcaíno. The remnants of the storm tracked into the Southwestern United States and dissipated over the Colorado River Valley.

Impact

Mexico

Hurricane Doreen dropped heavy rainfall along the western portions of Mexico and the Southwestern Region of the United States. The mainland of Mexico also received heavy rainfall, especially in the Sierra Madre Oriental mountains. In the city of Mexicali, the storm left more than 2,000 people homeless, many of which lived in shanty-style homes.

California
In anticipation of the storm, flash flood warnings were issued in the Colorado River Valley area, and were extended into southern California on August 16, including places such as Santa Barbara County, the mountains of San Diego County, Riverside County, and portions of the Mohave Desert. Heavy rainfall fell in southern California on August 16. Several other locations also reported heavy rainfall;  was reported in Calexico and  fell at Mitchell Caverns. At Edwards Air Force Base, the launch of Space Shuttle Enterprise on August 31 was delayed to September 7 after rainfall from Doreen flooded the runway of the previous flight.

In addition to heavy rain, high winds were reported. In Palm Springs, wind gusts were reported as high as 60 mph (95 km/h). As a result, several trees were felled and power outages occurred. Highway 86 and 111 were under water from Brawley, near the Mexican border to the Salton Sea. California State Route 98 was also flooded from Brawley to Blythe. Two of the four lanes on Interstate 15 were washed out from Los Angeles to Las Vegas, stranding thousands of gamblers in places like Barstow. Ocotillo, a town that was devastated during Hurricane Kathleen in 1976, was flooded again. Buses were sent to evacuate the townspeople, but the residents declined to evacuate. Overall, damage totaled $25 million, mostly in agricultural losses in San Diego and Imperial Counties. Eight deaths were reported. Six children were swept away in the Los Angeles River; five of them were rescued, but the sixth was later presumed dead.

Arizona
Doreen also produced heavy rainfall in a small area of southwestern Arizona, limited to the Yuma area. Light to moderate rainfall also occurred in other areas of the state, such as Nogales, where  of precipitation was recorded. Damage to roads, levees, houses, dikes were reported throughout the state, especially in the Bullhead City area.

While surveying damage in southwestern Arizona, a request was made to then-Governor Raul Hector Castro for $750,000 in emergency services funds. The American Red Cross had been in the area and spent $12,000 to assist families that were left homeless after the flood.

Elsewhere in the United States
In addition to street flooding, some roofs of houses and buildings collapsed.

In New Mexico, lesser amounts of rainfall were reported, and precipitation was limited to the northeastern and southwestern portions of the state. Rainfall was also minimal in the state of Utah, with only a few isolated areas reporting light precipitation, and generally did not exceed .

See also

 Hurricane Kathleen (1976)
 Hurricane Dolores (2015)
 List of Pacific hurricanes
 List of Baja California Peninsula hurricanes
 List of California hurricanes

References

External links
Monthly Weather Review
Rainfall map

Doreen
Doreen
Doreen
Doreen
Doreen
Doreen
1977 in Mexico
1977 natural disasters in the United States
August 1977 events in the United States
1977 in Arizona
1977 in California
1977 in New Mexico